The 1997 San Miguel Beermen season was the 23rd season of the franchise in the Philippine Basketball Association (PBA).

Draft pick

Notable dates
February 21: Former national team coach Ron Jacobs ushered his comeback in local basketball in the Beermen's 70-66 victory over Purefoods Corned Beef Cowboys, which also had a new head coach Eric Altamirano in both teams' first game of the season.  

July 22: San Miguel completed the semifinal cast in the Commissioner's Cup with an 87-79 win over Mobiline Cellulars, who were hoping to gain a tie and a playoff.   

September 21: Former Houston Rocket Larry Robinson debut with 33 points in San Miguel's 76-68 win over defending champion Alaska Milkmen.

Awards
Jeff Ward was voted the Commissioner's Cup Best Import.
Larry Robinson was voted the Governor's Cup Best Import.

Roster

 Team Manager: Nazario Avendaño

Transactions

Additions

Recruited imports

References

San Miguel Beermen seasons
San